Below are the squads for the 2016 AFC Solidarity Cup in Malaysia, which took place between 2 and 15 November 2016. The players' listed age is their age on the tournament's opening day.

Group A

Nepal
Head coach:  Koji Gyotoku

Brunei
Head coach:  Kwon Oh-son

Timor-Leste
Head coach:  Fábio Magrão

Group B

Sri Lanka
Head coach: Dudley Steinwall

Macau
Head coach: Tam Iao San

Mongolia
Head coach:  Toshiaki Imai

Laos
Head coach: Valakone Phomphakdy

References

2016 AFC Solidarity Cup